Hersman is an unincorporated community in Brown County, Illinois, United States. Hersman is located on Illinois Route 99, southeast of Mount Sterling.

References

Unincorporated communities in Brown County, Illinois
Unincorporated communities in Illinois